The  are twin tower buildings located in Kasumigaseki, Chiyoda, Tokyo, Japan. The buildings consist of East Tower and West Tower. Together with the adjacent Kasumigaseki Building, the first modern office skyscraper in Japan, the twin towers are landmarks in the Toranomon and Kasumigaseki area. The buildings are directly connected to Toranomon Station of Tokyo Metro Ginza Line.

East Tower
East Tower is owned by the Japanese Government and is occupied by Ministry of Education, Culture, Sports, Science and Technology and Board of Audit. The building is 33 stories or 156 meters high and the total floor area is 114,600 square meters.

West Tower
The Japanese Government and private sectors co-own West Tower. The lower half of the building is a governmental floors and is occupied by Financial Services Agency. Major tenants of the upper half are Teijin, Daiwa SB Investment, Aichi University Tokyo Office, Toho Tenax, MODEC, Tokuyama Corporation, K&L Gates Tokyo Office, Sugimura & Partners, and Kazan Kai (one of the co-owners). The building is 38 stories or 176 meters high and the total floor area is 118,700 square meters.

References

External links
 Official Web Site 

Skyscraper office buildings in Tokyo
Office buildings completed in 2007
Toyota Tsusho